The halfmoon (Medialuna californiensis), also known as the blue perch, is a species of marine ray-finned fish, a sea chub from the subfamily Scorpidinae, part of the family Kyphosidae. It is native to the coasts of the eastern Pacific Ocean off western North America. It is fished for using hook and line and it is a desirable food fish.

Description

The halfmoon has an elongate, compressed, oval body with a small pointed head. It has a small, horizontal mouth in which the upper jaw is partially hidden by the orbital bone when the mouth has closed. Each jaw has a single row of pointed teeth. It has a continuous dorsal fin which has 9-11 spines in the anterior portion which fold down into a scaly furrow, the posterior portion has 22-27 soft rays and these are higher than the spines. The anal fin has 3 spines and 17-21 soft rays. The caudal fin is marginally concave. Most of the head and body is covered in small, thick and rough scales except foe the area forward of the eyes. The colour is dark bluish grey to grey dorsally, paler ventrally sometimes with faint, narrow, vertical bars along the flanks. It has a dark blotch on the upper corner of the gill cover. The margins of the dorsal, anal and caudal fins are dark and the outer edge of each lobe of the caudal fin is white. Juvenile fish are blue above and silvery below. The shape of the caudal fin is said to resemble a crescent moon, leading to the common name.

Distribution
The Halfmoon is native to the eastern Pacific Ocean along the western coast of North America from Vancouver Island in the north to the Gulf of California, although it is rare north of Point Conception in California.

Habitat and biology
The halfmoon is frequently observed high in the water column over rocks and at middle depths over kelp. Their preferred habitats are rocky reefs, kelp forests, floating kelp pads, and oil rigs. This is an omnivorous species with kelp, red algae and green algae making up the bulk of its diet but it also feeds on a diversity of small invertebrates such as crustaceans, sponges and sea anemones. They are schooling fish. The juveniles are occasionally reported far offshore, although they are more frequent around shallow subtidal areas and kelp beds with the adults. The spawning season runs from June through to October and they are broadcast spawners. The fertilised eggs and newly hatched larvae are planktonic. The larvae are most numerous off northern Baja California The juveniles will school with juvenile opaleye beneath floating rafts of kelp.

Fisheries
The halfmoon is a prized species for recreational anglers using rod and line, it is a bycatch in traps and bait nets. In California its season runs from August to April. The flesh is lightly flavoured and the fish can be eaten as fillets or whole and cooked in a variety of methods.

Species description
The halfmoon was first formally described as Scorpis californiensis in 1876 by the Austrian ichthyologist Franz Steindachner with the type locality given as San Diego, California.

References

External links
 

Scorpidinae
Western North American coastal fauna
Fish described in 1876